Caspase-10 is an enzyme that, in humans, is encoded by the CASP10 gene.

This gene encodes a protein that is a member of the cysteine-aspartic acid protease (caspase) family. Sequential activation of caspases plays a central role in the execution-phase of cell apoptosis. Caspases exist as inactive proenzymes that undergo proteolytic processing at conserved aspartic residues to produce two subunits, large and small, that dimerize to form the active enzyme. This protein cleaves and activates caspases 3 and 7, and the protein itself is processed by caspase 8. Mutations in this gene are associated with apoptosis defects seen in type II autoimmune lymphoproliferative syndrome. Three alternatively spliced transcript variants encoding different isoforms have been described for this gene.

Interactions
Caspase 10 has been shown to interact with FADD, CFLAR, Caspase 8, Fas receptor, RYBP, TNFRSF1A and TNFRSF10B.

See also
 The Proteolysis Map
 Caspase

References

Further reading

External links
   GeneReviews/NCBI/NIH/UW entry on Autoimmune Lymphoproliferative Syndrome
 The MEROPS online database for peptidases and their inhibitors: C14.011

Enzymes
Caspases